Princess Anne Road is a major thoroughfare in the Hampton Roads area, connecting onto Knotts Island Road (NC 615) at the North Carolina–Virginia border, and ending in Downtown Norfolk, Virginia.

History 

Princess Anne Road was the spine road of Princess Anne County before its absorption into the city of Virginia Beach.

Transportation in Virginia Beach, Virginia
Transportation in Norfolk, Virginia
History of Virginia Beach, Virginia